The CenterPoint Energy Dayton Air Show is an annual event held at the Dayton International Airport in Vandalia, Ohio, eight miles north of Dayton, Ohio. From 2013 to 2019, the show has been held on a weekend in late June. Prior to 2013, and again starting in 2021, it was held in mid-July each year. The history of this flight exhibition dates back to 1910 and the Wright Company. Dayton is the hometown of the Wright brothers and is where Orville and Wilbur built their first powered aircraft. The show's main sponsor is CenterPoint Energy and it is considered to be one of the country's premier aviation events. It was sponsored by Vectren until 2018.

It is estimated that the 2010 Dayton Air Show attracted nearly 80,000 people and had a $5 million impact on the Dayton region's local economy. The 2012 show is estimated to have a $3 million impact on Dayton's economy.

There was no air show in 2020 due to the COVID-19 pandemic, but the show returned in July 2021.

US Air, Trade & Technology Conference and Exposition
The US Air Trade and Technology Conference and Exposition (USATT) was initiated by Congressman Mike Turner to bring together contractors, subcontractors, governments and others to discuss issues pertaining to the aerospace industry. The program focuses on topics such as UAVs, human performance, sensors, and alternative fuels. Although the USATT takes place during the Dayton Air Show, it is not open to the public.

Accidents and fatalities
An accident during a stunt flight resulted in the death of Jim LeRoy, who was pronounced dead on 28 July 2007, in a military MEDEVAC helicopter while in transit to Miami Valley Hospital in Dayton, Ohio. The crash was attributed to pilot error.

On 22 June 2013, an airplane carrying wing walker Jane Wicker crashed at the air show, killing both Wicker and pilot Charlie Schwenker.

On 23 June 2017, the day before the air show, a General Dynamics F-16 Fighting Falcon jet of the United States Air Force Thunderbirds display team, not scheduled to perform, was taxiing to a staging area after a familiarization flight, when witnesses reported a gust of wind flipped the aircraft onto its top in a grassy area next to the taxiway. Both the pilot and a team crew member were trapped in the airplane for one hour; the pilot suffered minor injuries while the crew member had no visible injuries. The Thunderbirds canceled their scheduled performances for both days of the air show.

Effect of weather on attendance
Unusually high temperatures led to greatly decreased attendance for the 2012 show. As such, it was announced in October of that year that the 2013 show would be moved from July to June. That change continued through 2016 (18-19 June 2016). The previous year's air show had lost attendance as well due to weather, however, the loss was due to heavy rains, which also forced the temporary grounding of some acts. An estimated 51,000 spectators attended the 2016 show, a large increase from the 40,000 of the previous year. This was despite the absence of a scheduled headliner act, the Blue Angels, following that group's temporary grounding after one of its pilots died in a crash on June 2.

Notes

References

External links

 Dayton Air Show
 (USATT) Website

Air shows in the United States
Aviation accidents and incidents at air shows
Tourist attractions in Montgomery County, Ohio
Culture of Dayton, Ohio
Annual events in Ohio
Aviation in Ohio